Filipendula glaberrima, also called Korean meadowsweet, is a species of plant in the family Rosaceae that is native to Korea.

References

External links
 
 

glaberrima
Plants described in 1902